Scott Wheeler (born 1965) is a Republican politician who was elected and currently serves in the Vermont House of Representatives. He represents the Orleans-1 Representative District.

References

1965 births
Living people
Republican Party members of the Vermont House of Representatives
Date of birth missing (living people)